Jach'a Warmi Qullu (Aymara jach'a big, warmi woman, qullu mountain, "big woman's mountain", also spelled Jachcha Huarmi Kkollu) is a  mountain in the Bolivian Andes. It is located in the La Paz Department, Inquisivi Province, Colquiri Municipality. It lies southwest of Kuntur Samaña and southeast of Iru Pata. The peak northeast of Jach'a Warmi Qullu is named Warmi Qullu. It has the same height.

References 

Mountains of La Paz Department (Bolivia)